The  is a major passenger railway company in Japan and is the largest of the seven Japan Railways Group companies. The company's headquarters are in Yoyogi, Shibuya, Tokyo, and next to the Shinjuku Station. It is listed in the Tokyo Stock Exchange (it formerly had secondary listings in the Nagoya and Osaka stock exchanges), is a constituent of the TOPIX Large70 index, and is also one of the three only Japan Railways Group constituents of the Nikkei 225 index, the other being JR Central and JR West.

History
JR East was incorporated on 1 April 1987 after being spun off from the government-run Japanese National Railways (JNR). The spin-off was nominally "privatization", as the company was actually a wholly owned subsidiary of the government-owned JNR Settlement Corporation for several years, and was not completely sold to the public until 2002.

Following the breakup, JR East ran the operations on former JNR lines in the Greater Tokyo Area, the Tōhoku region, and surrounding areas.

Lines
Railway lines of JR East primarily serve the Kanto and Tohoku regions, along with adjacent areas in Kōshin'etsu region (Niigata, Nagano, Yamanashi) and Shizuoka prefectures.

Shinkansen
JR East operates all of the Shinkansen, high-speed rail lines, north of Tokyo, except the Hokkaido Shinkansen, which is operated by JR Hokkaido.
 Tōhoku Shinkansen (Tokyo - Shin-Aomori) 
 Jōetsu Shinkansen (Tokyo - Niigata; Echigo-Yuzawa - Gala Yuzawa)
 Hokuriku Shinkansen (Tokyo - Jōetsumyōkō)
 Yamagata Shinkansen (Tokyo - Shinjo)
 Akita Shinkansen (Tokyo - Akita)

The Tokyo–Osaka Tōkaidō Shinkansen is owned and operated by the Central Japan Railway Company (JR Central), although it stops at several JR East stations.

Kanto regional lines

These lines have sections inside the Tokyo suburban area designated by JR East. This does not necessarily mean that the lines are fully inside the Greater Tokyo Area.

Koshinetsu regional lines

Tohoku regional lines

Train services
Below is the full list of limited express (including Shinkansen) and express train services operated on JR East lines as of 2022.

Shinkansen
Asama
Hakutaka
Hayabusa
Hayate
Kagayaki
Komachi
Nasuno
Tanigawa/Max Tanigawa
Toki/Max Toki
Tsubasa
Yamabiko

Limited express (daytime)
Akagi/Swallow Akagi
Azusa
Fuji Excursion
Hitachi and Tokiwa
Inaho
Kaiji/View Kaiji/Hamakaiji
Kusatsu
Narita Express
Nikkō and Kinugawa
Saphir Odoriko/Odoriko
Sazanami
Shirayuki
Shiosai
Shōnan
Tsugaru
Wakashio

Limited express (overnight)
Sunrise Izumo/Sunrise Seto (not operated by JR East, operated by JR Central and JR-West over the Tokaido Main Line, part of which JR East owns between Tokyo and Atami)

Stations

During fiscal 2017, the busiest stations in the JR East network by average daily passenger count were:

 Shinjuku Station (778,618)
 Ikebukuro Station (566,516)
 Tokyo Station (452,549)
 Yokohama Station (420,192)
 Shinagawa Station (378,566)
 Shibuya Station (370,669)
 Shimbashi Station (277,404)
 Omiya Station (255,147)
 Akihabara Station (250,251)
 Kita-Senju Station (217,838)

Subsidiaries

Higashi-Nihon Kiosk - provides newspapers, drinks and other items in station kiosks and operates the Newdays convenience store chain
JR Bus Kanto / JR Bus Tohoku - intercity bus operators
Nippon Restaurant Enterprise - provides bentō box lunches on trains and in train stations
Tokyo Monorail - (70% ownership stake)
East Japan Marketing & Communications

Sponsorship
JR East co-sponsors the JEF United Chiba J-League football club , which was formed by a merger between the JR East and Furukawa Electric company teams.

Environmental issues
JR East aims to reduce its carbon emissions by half, as measured over the period 1990–2030. This would be achieved by increasing the efficiency of trains and company-owned thermal power stations and by developing hybrid trains.

Union issues
The Tokyo Metropolitan Police Department has stated that JR East's official union is a front for a revolutionary political organization called the Japan Revolutionary Communist League (Revolutionary Marxist Faction). An investigation of this is ongoing.

East Japan Railway Culture Foundation
The East Japan Railway Culture Foundation is a non-profit organization established by JR East for the purpose of developing a "richer railway culture". The Railway Museum in Saitama is operated by the foundation.

Bids outside Japan
JR East holds a 15% shareholding in West Midlands Trains with Abellio and Mitsui that commenced operating the West Midlands franchise in England in December 2017. The same consortium has also been listed to bid for the South Eastern franchise.

References

External links

East Japan Railway Company Web Site (in English)
JR East official apology for "Inaho No.14" accident on 25 December 2005
  Wiki collection of bibliographic works on East Japan Railway Company

 
Transport companies based in Tokyo
Companies listed on the Tokyo Stock Exchange
Railway companies established in 1987
1500 V DC railway electrification
25 kV AC railway electrification
Japanese companies established in 1987